= BYOI =

BYOI may refer to:

- A four letter ICAO Airport Code (currently unassigned)
- Bring your own Infrastructure
- Bring Your Own Iron
- Bring Your Own Improv, a shortform improvisational comedy troupe based in Providence, RI, USA
- Bring Your Own Interface
- Bring Your Own Identity
- Bring Your Own Isot
